New World Department Store China Limited is a Hong Kong-based holding company for department store chains in the Mainland China. New World Department Store China is a subsidiary of another listed company New World Development. It has self-owned stores and managed stores in Mainland China and in the past in Hong Kong. It operates under two brands: "New World" and Ba-li Chun-tian. The chairman is Henry Cheng, the son of the Hong Kong billionaire, Cheng Yu-tung. It was listed on the Stock Exchange of Hong Kong with IPO price of HK$5.8 per share.

See also
New World China Land

References

External links
 

Companies listed on the Hong Kong Stock Exchange
Civilian-run enterprises of China
Department stores of Hong Kong
Department stores of China
New World Development subsidiaries
Retail companies established in 1993
Retailing in Hong Kong